Type 744 buoy tender and its derivatives with the NATO reporting name Yannan (延南) class is a class of Chinese buoy tender that is in service with the People's Liberation Army Navy (PLAN) and Chinese civilian governmental establishments.  It is a boat or vessel which services and replaces buoys.

Precursors

Type 985 
Type 744 derived from the Type 985 buoy tender, the first purpose built buoy tender in the Chinese inventory. Type 985 is designed to be the replacement of earlier buoy tenders converted from former US Navy net laying ships. In the early 1980s, maritime navigational responsibility was transferred from PLAN to Ministry of Transport of the People's Republic of China (MOT). Type 985 was among the equipment transferred from PLAN to MOT and has remained in civilian service since.

Type 994 
Type 994 buoy tender is the larger cousin of the smaller Type 985 buoy tender, from which it is developed. Like Type 985, all units of this class were transferred to civilian service under MOT:

Type 744 and 744A
Type 744 employs design modifications based on the experience gained on earlier ships. Type 744 is designed by the 708th Institute of China State Shipbuilding Corporation. The 708th Institute is more commonly known as China Shipbuilding and Oceanic Engineering Design Academy. Construction began in December 1979 and four were completed, with the last ship entering service in May 1981. There are two subtypes, the civilian version Type 744 and the naval version Type 744A. The most obvious external visual difference between Types 744 and Type 744A is that the gun mount at in the bow of the naval version Type 744A is replaced by a mast in the civilian version. The ship received NATO reporting name as Yannan (延南) class. One of the Type 744A ships, Dongbiao 263, retired from Chinese Navy on August 1, 2015, and transferred to civilian service. Specification:
Length between perpendiculars  (m): 66.6
Beam (m): 11.8
Depth (m): 6
Draft (m): 4
Displacement (t): 1750
Class notation: ZC
Crew: 44
Bunks: 52
Fuel oil tank (cu m): 161
Fresh water tank (cu m): 276
Propulsion: Two 8NVD48A-20 diesel engine @ 973 kW each
Diesel generator: 72 kW x 4
Crane: PBW 12/15 60 kW x 1

Ships

References

Auxiliary tender classes
Auxiliary ships of the People's Liberation Army Navy